The 2022 Tulane Green Wave football team represented Tulane University in the 2022 NCAA Division I FBS football season. The Green Wave played their home games at Yulman Stadium in New Orleans, Louisiana, and competed in the American Athletic Conference (The American). They were led by seventh-year head coach Willie Fritz. They finished the season 12–2, 7–1 in AAC play to earn a trip to the AAC championship game. The Green Wave defeated UCF to win the AAC championship, the school's first conference championship since 1998 and its first AAC championship. They received a bid to the Cotton Bowl Classic to play No-10 ranked USC. It was their first major bowl game since the 1940 Sugar Bowl. Tulane defeated USC in the Cotton Bowl 46–45, scoring 16 points in the final four minutes to win the game.

Following a 45–31 win against South Florida, Tulane was ranked in the AP Poll for the first time since 1998. It was also the fastest Tulane has ever clinched bowl eligibility in school history at October 15. The game against UCF at home was the first home game in Tulane between two ranked opponents since 1949. For the first time since 1984, Tulane beat an opponent ranked in the AP top 25, although Tulane did beat Army in 2019 when they were ranked No. 25 in the Coaches Poll. The ten-win turnaround from two wins in 2021 to twelve in 2022 is the best in NCAA history. The Green Wave were ranked 9th in the final AP Poll, the highest ranking of the Green Wave since 1998.

Previous season 
The Green Wave finished the 2021 season 2–10, 1–7 in AAC play to finish in a three-way tie for last place.

Schedule
Tulane and The American announced the 2022 football schedule on February 17, 2022.

Roster

Game summaries

vs UMass

vs Alcorn State (FCS)

at Kansas State

vs Southern Miss

at Houston

vs East Carolina

at South Florida

vs Memphis

at Tulsa

vs No. 22 UCF

vs SMU

at No. 24 Cincinnati

vs No. 22 UCF (AAC Championship Game)

vs No. 10 USC (Cotton Bowl)

Rankings

References

Tulane
Tulane Green Wave football seasons
American Athletic Conference football champion seasons
Cotton Bowl Classic champion seasons
Tulane Green Wave football